The 2008–09 Segunda Divisão season was the 75th season of the competition and the 59th season of recognised third-tier football in Portugal.

Overview
The league was contested by 47 teams in 4 divisions with GD Chaves, FC Penafiel, CD Fátima and AD Carregado winning the respective divisional competitions and gaining promotion to the Liga de Honra.  The overall championship was won by CD Fátima.

League standings

Série A

Série A Promotion Group

Série A Relegation Group

Série B

Série B Promotion Group

Série B Relegation Group

Série C

Série C Promotion Group

Série C Relegation Group

Série D

Série D Promotion Group

Série D Relegation Group

Championship playoffs

Semi-finals

Final
The final was played on 5 May 2009 in Águeda.

Footnotes

External links
 Portuguese Division Two «B» - footballzz.co.uk

Portuguese Second Division seasons
Port
3